Lichte is a municipality in Thuringia, Germany.

Lichte may also refer to:
Lichte (river), of Thuringia, Germany
Lichte Porzellan, a German porcelain manufacturer
Lichte (Thuringia) station, a former Deutsche Reichsbahn station in Lichte
Lichte (Thuringia) east station, a former Deutsche Reichsbahn station east of Lichte

People with that name
Arthur Lichte (born 1949) is a former general in the United States Air Force

See also
Lichte Trough, an undersea trough named for Heinrich Lichte